Ibrahim Cissoko (born 26 March 2003) is a Dutch professional footballer who plays as a winger for NEC Nijmegen.

Career
Cissoko joined NEC Nijmegen in 2016 after he had been at VVV-Venlo and had been expelled from the Vitesse Arnhem academy for unprofessional behaviour. He signed his first professional contract with NEC in January 2021.Cissoko made his Eredivisie debut in a 1-0 lost away match at FC Utrecht on 29 April 2022.He scored his first league goal on 8 May 2022 against Go Ahead Eagles in a late 1-0 victory.He signed a new contract in July 2022 with NEC Nijmegen to take him with the club to the summer of 2024 with the option of an extra season.He scored his first league goal of the 2022-23 season on 26 August 2022 against FC Groningen, another late goal, this time an 88th equaliser in a 1-1 draw.

Style of play
Cissoko has been described as a quick winger who has the potential to form formidable and pacey partnerships up front.

Personal life
Born in the Netherlands, Cissoko is of Guinean descent.

Career statistics

Club

References

External links
 
 Ibrahim Cissoko at Eredivise
 Ibrahim Cissoko at Footballdatabase

Living people
2003 births
Footballers from Nijmegen
Dutch footballers
Dutch people of Guinean descent
Association football midfielders
NEC Nijmegen players
Eredivisie players